Danielle "Dani" Jones (born August 21, 1996) is an American middle-distance runner. She is a four-time NCAA Division I champion winning two gold medals at the 2017 NCAA Division I Indoor Track and Field Championships in the 3000-meters and Indoor Distance Medley Relay, a gold in 2018 in Cross-Country, and later won the 2019 NCAA Outdoor Championships in the 5000-meters. In May 2018, she finished first at the National Women's 1500-meters at the Prefontaine Classic in a time of 4:07.74.

High School career 
Born in Fort Wayne, Indiana and raised in Phoenix, Arizona, Jones attended and ran for Desert Vista High School. In spring 2012, she won her first Arizona state title in the 1600-meters. The following year, she won the Arizona state cross country title. She eventually set Arizona high school state outdoor track records for the mile, 1600 m, and 3200 m.

College career
Jones attended the University of Colorado from 2015-2020 where she was a four-time NCAA Divion I champion capturing titles in the outdoor 5000-meters, indoor 3000-meters, cross-country, and the distance medley relay. She earned All-America honors 12-times.

As a collegiate athlete for the Colorado Buffaloes, she won the 3000 m and the distance medley relay at the 2017 NCAA Division I Outdoor Track and Field Championships. During a redshirt season in spring 2018, she won the National Women's 1500 m at the Prefontaine Classic. That fall, she led her team to an NCAA title at the 2018 NCAA Division I Cross Country Championships by way of her first-place finish in the race. This was the second time in two decades that the Buffaloes had both a first-place finisher and finished in first place as a team at the national championships. She won the Honda Sports Award as the nation's best female collegiate cross-country competitor in 2019.

Professional career
In December 2020, Jones announces that she would be pursuing a professional running career. She signed with Hawi Management, choosing Merhawi Keflezighi as her agent. Soon thereafter she secured a professional contract with New Balance and then joined the Bosshard training group in Boulder. Colorado.

Major international competitions

Domestic competitions

References

External links 
 "Dani Jones Fits Fast Races Into Jam-Packed Schedule"
 "Desert Vista runner Dani Jones looking for history"
 
 

Living people
1996 births
American female middle-distance runners
Colorado Buffaloes women's track and field athletes
Colorado Buffaloes women's cross country runners
Sportspeople from Arizona
21st-century American women